Following is a list of largest companies in Pakistan:

Conglomerates

Companies

References

Pakistan
Largest
  
companies